The Blanche River (in French: Rivière Blanche) flows in the administrative region of Chaudière-Appalaches, in the province of Quebec, in Canada, in the regional county municipality of:
 MRC Bellechasse Regional County Municipality: municipalité of Saint-Philémon;
 MRC Les Etchemins Regional County Municipality: municipalities of Saint-Magloire and Saint-Luc-de-Bellechasse.

The Blanche River is a tributary of the north shore of Etchemin River which flows toward north and empties on the shore into the St. Lawrence River, in front of Quebec.

Geography 
The main neighboring watersheds of the Blanche river are:
 north side: Beaudoin stream, Milieu stream, rivière du Pin, Gabriel River;
 east side: Etchemin River;
 south side: Etchemin River;
 west side: Dix stream, Bœuf River.

The Blanche river has its source in the Massif du Sud, in the Notre Dame Mountains, in the municipality of Saint-Luc-de-Bellechasse.

From its source, the Blanche river flows in a forest zone over  distributed according to the following segments:
  towards the south in Saint-Philémon, to the municipal limit of Saint-Magloire;
  towards the south, in Saint-Magloire;
  south, to the 12e-Rang road;
  towards the south-east, up to the tenth Rang;
  south-east, then south-west, to its confluence.

The Blanche river flows onto the north bank of the Etchemin River which here constitutes the municipal limit between Saint-Luc-de-Bellechasse and Sainte-Sabine.

Toponymy 
The toponym Rivière Blanche was formalized on 18 July 1973 at the Commission de toponymie du Québec. Before 1973, its official name was Rivière Etchemin Nord-Est although its current name was visible on some maps long before its officialization.

See also 

 Massif-du-Sud Regional Park, a ski mountain
 List of rivers of Quebec

References 

Rivers of Chaudière-Appalaches
Les Etchemins Regional County Municipality
Bellechasse Regional County Municipality